Brief Encounter is a 1974 British-Italian television film starring Richard Burton and Sophia Loren, adapted from the play Still Life by Noël Coward. The plot of the film is about two strangers, each married to another, who meet in a railway station and find themselves in a brief but intense affair. The material was previously the basis for the David Lean film Brief Encounter (1945). Burton was cast at the last moment, after Robert Shaw dropped out.

The film had its premiere on U.S. television on 12 November 1974 as part of the Hallmark Hall of Fame series on NBC.

The two lead roles were cast with "wild disregard for suitability" according to Brian McFarlane, who has described the film as "a total disaster." Originally intended to have a television screening in the United States, followed by a cinema release in the rest of the world, its poor reception in New York led to the international plans being abandoned. Rank, who owned the theatrical rights in the UK, sold them to television. According to David Shipman, reviewing Burton's career in The Great Movie Stars, this remake was "widely viewed as a ludicrous undertaking."

Cast

 Richard Burton as Alec Harvey
 Sophia Loren as Anna Jesson
 Jack Hedley as Graham Jesson
 Rosemary Leach as Mrs Gaines
 Ann Firbank as Melanie Harvey
 John Le Mesurier as Stephen

References

External links

1974 television films
1974 films
British television films
Films directed by Alan Bridges
Italian television films
Films shot at Pinewood Studios
1970s English-language films